Thirumangalakudi is a village near Aduthurai in the Thiruvidaimarudur taluk of Thanjavur district in Tamil Nadu, India. Prananadeswarar Temple, a Hindu temple dedicated to Shiva, is located here.

Demographics 

According to the 2001 census, Thirumangalakudi had a population of 7,500 with 3,474 males and 3,719 females. The sex ratio was 1,071. The village had a literacy rate of 90. Thirmangalaguri has 5 mosques and size-able amount of muslim population, who peacefully co-exist with fellow Hindus.

References 

 

Villages in Thanjavur district